Monoplex parthenopeus,<ref>"Cymatium parthenopeum (Salis, 1793)"], CLEMAM, accessed 18 February 2011.</ref> common name the giant triton or giant hairy triton, is a species of sea snail, a marine gastropod mollusk in the family Cymatiidae. It preys on other molluscs.

Fossil records
This species have been recorded as fossils from the Miocene to the Quaternary (from 15.97 to 0.0 million years ago).

 Distribution 
This species occurs worldwide including:
 The Western Atlantic Ocean
 New Zealand

 Description 
The maximum recorded shell length is 180 mm.

 Habitat 
Minimum recorded depth is 0 m. Maximum recorded depth is 75 m.

Life cycle
Hairy tritons are notable for having particularly long planktonic periods. The veliger larvae remain in the plankton for nearly 300 days, dispersing as far as 4000 km. This is the longest known larval duration and dispersal distance of any marine invertebrate which occurs along the west coast of North America.

Gallery

References

 Salis Marschlins C. U. von (1793). Reisen in verschieden Provinzen den Königreischs Neapel. Zurich and Leipzig, Ziegler Vol. I: pp. 442 + 10 pl.
 Beu, A. G. (1970). The Mollusca of the subgenus Monoplex (family Cymatiidae). Transactions of the Royal Society of New Zealand, Biological Sciences 11 (17): 225-237
 Morton B. & Morton JE. (1983). The sea shore ecology of Hong Kong. Hong Kong: Hong Kong University Press
 Gofas, S.; Afonso, J.P.; Brandào, M. (Ed.). (S.a.). Conchas e Moluscos de Angola = Coquillages et Mollusques d'Angola. [Shells and molluscs of Angola. Universidade Agostinho / Elf Aquitaine Angola: Angola. 140 pp
 Gofas, S.; Le Renard, J.; Bouchet, P. (2001). Mollusca, in: Costello, M.J. et al. (Ed.) (2001). European register of marine species: a check-list of the marine species in Europe and a bibliography of guides to their identification. Collection Patrimoines Naturels, 50: pp. 180–213
 Rolán E., 2005. Malacological Fauna From The Cape Verde Archipelago. Part 1, Polyplacophora and Gastropoda. Rosenberg, G., F. Moretzsohn, and E. F. García. 2009. Gastropoda (Mollusca) of the Gulf of Mexico'', Pp. 579–699 in Felder, D.L. and D.K. Camp (eds.), Gulf of Mexico–Origins, Waters, and Biota. Biodiversity. Texas A&M Press, College Station, Texas.
 Beu A.G. 2010 [August]. Neogene tonnoidean gastropods of tropical and South America: contributions to the Dominican Republic and Panama Paleontology Projects and uplift of the Central American Isthmus. Bulletins of American Paleontology 377-378: 550 pp, 79 pls.

External links 
 Pilsbry, H. A. (1945). New Floridian marine mollusks. The Nautilus. 59(2): 59-60
 Perry, G. (1811). Conchology, or the natural history of shells: containing a new arrangement of the genera and species, illustrated by coloured engravings executed from the natural specimens, and including the latest discoveries. 4 pp., 61 plates. London
 Born, I. Von. (1778). Index rerum naturalium Musei Cæsarei Vindobonensis. Pars I.ma. Testacea. Verzeichniß der natürlichen Seltenheiten des k. k. Naturalien Cabinets zu Wien. Erster Theil. Schalthiere; Vindobonae (Vienna); (Kraus)
 Risso, A. (1826-1827). Histoire naturelle des principales productions de l'Europe Méridionale et particulièrement de celles des environs de Nice et des Alpes Maritimes. Paris, F.G. Levrault. 3(XVI): 1-480, 14 pls.
  Hutton, F. W. (1873). Catalogue of the marine Mollusca of New Zealand with diagnoses of the species. Didsbury, Wellington. xx + 116 pp.
 Orbigny A. d'. (1841-1853). Mollusques. In: R. de la Sagra (ed.). Histoire physique, politique et naturelle de l'Ile de Cuba. Arthus Bertrand, Paris. Vol 1
 Gould, A. A. (1849). Descriptions of new species of shells, brought home by the U. S. Exploring Expedition. Proceedings of the Boston Society of Natural History. 3: 83-85, 89-92, 106-108, 118-121
 Gould, A. A. (1860). Descriptions of new shells collected by the United States North Pacific Exploring Expedition. Proceedings of the Boston Society of Natural History. 7: 323-336 
 Smith, E. A. (1890). Report on the marine molluscan fauna of the island of St. Helena. Proceedings of the Zoological Society of London. (1890): 247-317, pls 21-24
 Bellardi, L. (1873). I molluschi dei terreni terziarii del Piemonte e della Liguria. Parte I. Cephalopoda, Pteropoda, Heteropoda. Gasteropoda (Muricidae et Tritonidae). Stamperia Reale, Torino, 264 pp., 15 pl.
 Drawing of the shell
 

Cymatiidae
Gastropods described in 1793
Taxobox binomials not recognized by IUCN